The black-winged red bishop (Euplectes hordeaceus), formerly known in southern Africa as the fire-crowned bishop, is a resident breeding bird species in tropical Africa from Senegal to Sudan and south to Angola, Tanzania, Zimbabwe and Mozambique.

This common weaver occurs in a range of open country, especially tall grassland and often near water. It builds a spherical woven nest in tall grass. 2-4 eggs are laid.

The black-winged red bishop is a stocky 13–15 cm bird. The breeding male is scarlet apart from his black face, belly and wings and brown tail.  The conical bill is thick and black. He displays prominently, singing high-pitched twitters from tall grass, puffing out his feathers or performing a slow hovering display flight.

The non-breeding male is yellow-brown, streaked above and shading to whitish below. It has a whitish supercilium. It resembles non-breeding male northern red bishop, but is darker and has black wings. Females are similar, but paler. Young birds have wider pale fringes on their flight feathers.

The black-winged red bishop is a gregarious species which feeds on seed, grain and some insects.

References

 Birds of The Gambia by Barlow, Wacher and Disley,

External links
 (Black-winged red bishop = ) Fire-crowned bishop - Species text in The Atlas of Southern African Birds

black-winged red bishop
Birds of Sub-Saharan Africa
black-winged red bishop
black-winged red bishop